Jalle is a  Payam in Bor North County, in Jonglei State, South Sudan.  It is situated on the east side of the  Bahr al Jabal River between  Bor and  Twic East.

History
In 1988, during the  Second Sudanese Civil War (1983-2005), a  MiG-23MS crashed in Jalle Payam near Kolmarek.   SPLA Radio reported at the time that the jet had suffered from a technical fault.  It was sometimes later reported that the plane had been brought down by the SPLA.  The aircraft's pilot, a second lieutenant from Benghazi, Libya, was captured by people living near the crash site and turned over to the  Sudan People's Liberation Army (SPLA).  The pilot and his aircraft were held out by the SPLA as "concrete evidence" of foreign involvement in the Second Sudanese Civil War.

Demographics
Jalle is composed of four bomas: Akuai-deng, Jalle, Kolmarek, and Kuei-juet.  According to the Fifth Population and Housing Census of Sudan, conducted in April 2008, Jalle had a combined population of 13,506 people, composed of 7,024 male and 6,482 female residents.

Jalle is home to Juet, Aboudit, and Alian communities.

Notes

References 

Geography of South Sudan
Jonglei State
Subdivisions of South Sudan